Hexapopha is a genus of spiders in the family Oonopidae. It was first described in 2014 by Platnick, Berniker & Víquez. , it contains 4 species, all in Costa Rica.

References

Oonopidae
Araneomorphae genera
Spiders of Central America